Wonderland Cave is the largest cave in northwestern Arkansas.  It is located on Dartmoor Road in Bella Vista, northeast of Bella Vista Lake and east of United States Route 71.  The cave was first developed in the 1920s, and transformed into a nightclub in the 1930s, finishing a cavernous space within it with a concrete floor, stage for musicians, and decorations reminiscent of Alice in Wonderland.  Portions of the facility have also been used historically for the aging of locally produced wine, and at least one session of the Arkansas General Assembly has been held in the cave.  A local organization is developing plans to reopen the site as a tourist attraction.

The cave was listed on the National Register of Historic Places in 1988.

See also
National Register of Historic Places listings in Benton County, Arkansas

References

Caves of Arkansas
Landforms of Benton County, Arkansas
Tourist attractions in Benton County, Arkansas
National Register of Historic Places in Benton County, Arkansas
Bella Vista, Arkansas